Is...Not Nicole Kidman is the third stand-up comedy special by stand-up comedian Kathy Griffin on Bravo and her fifth overall. This special precedes the series premiere of Kathy Griffin: My Life on the D-list.

Track listing

Personnel

Technical and production
Stacy Brewster - associate producer
Tom Bull - supervising producer
Scott Butler - producer
Sandy Chanley - executive producer
Keith Truesdell - producer
Eban Scheltetter - music producer
Brent Carpenter - film editor
Mark Hoffman - production design
Bill Kappelman - sound: A2
Larry Reed - sound mixer
Blaine Stewart - post-production audio: Post Plus
Jeff Pierce - on-line editor
Michelle Walsh - assistant editor
Jahmir Blanchard - production associate
Jesse Bryner - production associate
Mark Hansson - associate director / stage manager
Renee Olsen - production associate
John Pritchett - technical director
Mark Reilly - assistant: Sandy Chanley
Doug Shaffer - production enthusiast
Frederique Barrera - production coordinator (uncredited)

Visuals and imagery
Cynthia Bachman Brown - makeup stylist (as Cynthia Bachman)
Caroline Wiseman - hair stylist
Marvin Bluth - tape operator
Randy Gomez -  camera operator
Greg Grouwinkel - camera operator
Marc Hunter - camera operator
Guy Jones - video operator
Ritch Kenney - camera operator
Simon Miles - lighting designer
Danny Webb - camera operator (as Dan Webb)
Easter Xua - camera operator
Judith Brewer Curtis - wardrobe stylist (as Judith Curtis)

References

External links
Kathy Griffin's Official Website

Kathy Griffin albums
Stand-up comedy albums
2005 live albums